Rafael Aburto Renovales (2 November 1913 – 9 March 2014) was a Spanish architect. His most famous works are Casa Sindical de Madrid and Obra Sindical del Hogar. Aburto helped organize the Council of Spanish Architectural Associations. Aburto was born in Neguri, Vizcaya, Spain. He studied at Madrid School of Architecture. He turned 100 in November 2013 and died of natural causes in Madrid, aged 100.

References

1913 births
2014 deaths
Men centenarians
20th-century Spanish architects
Spanish centenarians
Architects from the Basque Country (autonomous community)
People from Getxo
Technical University of Madrid alumni